The 2013 World Games were held in Cali, Colombia, from July 25 to August 4, 2013.

Acrobatic gymnastics

Aerobic gymnastics

Air sports

Archery

Artistic roller skating

Beach handball

Boules sports

Bowling

Canoe polo

Cue sports

Dancesport

Finswimming

Fistball

Flying disc

Inline hockey

Inline speed skating

Ju-jitsu

Karate

Korfball

Lifesaving

Orienteering

Powerlifting

Racquetball

Rhythmic gymnastics

Road speed skating

Rugby sevens

Sport climbing

Squash

Sumo

Trampoline gymnastics

Tug of war

Water skiing

Invitational sports

Canoe marathon

Duathlon

Softball

Wushu

References

External links
 Official website
 Complete results
 International World Games Association

Medalists
2013